Intercom, Inc. is a software company that specializes in business messaging, providing businesses with a way to chat with their customers. Intercom has its headquarters in San Francisco with offices in Chicago, Dublin, Sydney and London.

History
Intercom was founded in California in 2011 by four Irish designers and engineers, Eoghan McCabe, Des Traynor, Ciaran Lee, and David Barrett. They previously ran Irish software design consultancy Contrast, which made a bug tracking tool called Exceptional. After selling Exceptional to Rackspace in 2011, they used the proceeds to start Intercom.

In 2012 Twitter co-founder Biz Stone invested an undisclosed sum in Intercom. Shortly after, the company received seed funding from David Sacks, Huddle founder Andy McLoughlin, and others like Dan Martell, 500 Global (previously 500 Startups), and Digital Garage. In March 2013 it announced a $6 million Series A round led by Social Capital. In January 2014 it received a $23 million Series B funding led by Bessemer Venture Partners. Intercom also received a $50 million Series C-1 funding led by Index Ventures.

In 2017 Intercom offered to pay the legal fees for those affected by US president Donald Trump’s proposal to ban Muslims who wanted to relocate to Ireland.

In 2018, Intercom announced a $125 million Series D round led by Kleiner Perkins, with participation from Google Ventures.

In June 2020, Intercom's founder and then chief executive officer Eoghan McCabe announced at an internal company "all hands" meeting that he would be moving to the role of chairman and standing down as CEO. Karen Peacock was announced as Intercom's new chief executive, effective July 1, 2020. A year before, McCabe had admitted to 'poor judgment' with female staff but was supported by Peacock, then the chief operating officer, who called him "an exceptional leader who is visionary and strategic, as well as kind, genuine and transparent". McCabe was accused of slapping the buttocks of a female employee and propositioning another one after a night of drinks, however, both internal & external investigations cleared McCabe of wrongdoing. In July 2021, Intercom's co-founder and then chief technology officer (CTO) Ciarán Lee left the company. McCabe was reappointed by the company's board as the CEO in October 2022.

Products
In 2020, Intercom rebuilt its website as a server-side rendered React application with content pulled from Contentful (acting as a CMS). No content is used in the site's Git repo. Previously, the site was built using Ruby on Rails.

References

External links 
 

Companies based in San Francisco
Software companies based in California
Software companies established in 2011
500 Startups companies
Software companies of the United States